Budlong Farm is an historic farmhouse in Warwick, Rhode Island.  It is a -story wood-frame house, with a gambrel roof and a large central chimney.  Its current entrance is asymmetrically placed on the north facade, although the original main entry was on the south side.  The house was probably built sometime between 1700 and 1720 by John Budlong, whose family was one of the first to settle the area after King Philip's War.  The property is a rare local example of architecture to survive from that period.

The house was listed on the National Register of Historic Places in 1983.

See also
National Register of Historic Places listings in Kent County, Rhode Island

References

Houses on the National Register of Historic Places in Rhode Island
Houses in Warwick, Rhode Island
National Register of Historic Places in Kent County, Rhode Island